Hope II (in German, Die Hoffnung II) is an oil-on-canvas painting with added gold and platinum by the Austrian symbolist artist Gustav Klimt, made in 1907–08, depicting a pregnant woman with closed eyes.  It was the second of Klimt's works to focus on a pregnant woman, both depicting Herma, one of his favourite models. It was entitled Vision by Klimt, but has become known as Hope II after the earlier work Hope, which is now distinguished as Hope I. Hope II was acquired by the Museum of Modern Art in New York City in 1978.

Klimt painted the heavily pregnant Herma in Hope I in 1903, in which she was depicted naked.  In Hope II, she is wearing a long dress or cloak decorated with geometric shapes.  She has long brown hair and closed eyes, bowing her head towards her bare breasts and burgeoning abdomen.  A human skull representing death appears from behind her stomach – perhaps a sign of the dangers of labour, or possibly a memento mori (in Hope I, she is also accompanied by a skull and several deathlike figures).  At the foot of the painting, three woman also bow their heads, as if praying or perhaps mourning.  

The square painting measures .  The women occupy the central third of the painting, with a darker gold-flecked background to either side.  The woman's clothing, decorated with gold leaf like a Byzantine artwork and richly coloured and patterned, but flat like an Orthodox icon, contrasts with the delicately painted and contoured human faces and bare flesh, and also with the darker tones of the background.

Hope II was exhibited at the first Vienna  in 1908.  Due to the scandalous nudity of its central figure, Hope I was not exhibited until the second Vienna Kunstschau the following year.

The painting was acquired by  before December 1914, and it was sold in the late 1930s by the Neue Galerie of Otto Kallir or his successor Vita Künstler.  It remained in private collections until 1978, when it was sold by Hans Barnas. It is now in the collection of the Museum of Modern Art (MOMA) in New York City, United States.

References

 Gustav Klimt. Hope, II. 1907–08, MOMA
 Gustav Klimt. Hope, II. 1907–08, MOMA multimedia
 Gustav Klimt. Hope, II. 1907–08, Google Arts & Culture

Paintings by Gustav Klimt
1908 paintings
Paintings in the collection of the Museum of Modern Art (New York City)
Pregnancy in art